In Reverse is the seventh album by alternative rock musician Matthew Sweet.  It was released on Volcano Entertainment in 1999.

Cover
The upside-down cover of the album features an oil painting by artist Margaret Keane, and the liner notes are in reverse.

Release
The album was met with little commercial success, but with very favorable reviews. Rolling Stone wrote that the "songs are such perfect little valentines that the production just brings them larger to life". Entertainment Weekly gave the album an A−, noting the "intriguing side trips into forests of thick guitar chords". CMJ wrote that the songs "transcend museum-quality affectation and exude a multitude of bittersweet charms.". Critic Stephen Thompson of The A.V. Club wrote that In Reverse "finds [Sweet] once again at his best", adding that "its 14 tracks are uniformly strong, with muscular rockers ("Split Personality," "Write Your Own Song") competing for attention with smooth, lush, sugary fare ("If Time Permits," the knockout ballads "Trade Places" and "Worse To Live"). Stephen Thomas Erlewine, of Allmusic, praised the record's "cavernous reverb", and wrote that "this rich music is a personal interpretation of lush chamber pop and psychedelia, giving a musical counterpart for lovely melancholy songs of heartbreak and disillusion". Jerry McCulley of Amazon.com wrote, "Epic in scope and harmonically intoxicating," adding, "this is an album by an artist measuring the distance between his reach and his grasp, his good sense and self-indulgence, his confidence growing with every back-to-the future track."

Details
The song, "Faith in You", was featured in the film, Drive Me Crazy. For the nine minute thirty-seven seconds closing song, "Thunderstorm", Sweet combined three bass guitar lines, and other selections, such as "If Time Permits", hint of sound/song reversal as implied in the album's title.

Track listing

Bonus tracks

Personnel
Matthew Sweet - vocals, guitar, bass, organ, synthesizer, percussion
Bruce Fowler - trombone
Walt Fowler - trumpet, flugelhorn
Rick Cunha - acoustic guitar
Jim Keltner - drums
Victor Bisetti - percussion
Don Heffington - percussion
Carol Kaye - bass
Greg Kurstin - piano, organ, harpsichord
Greg Leisz - guitar, pedal steel
Fred Maher - drums, percussion
Tony Marsico - acoustic bass
Ric Menck - drums, percussion
Jamie Muhoberac - organ, piano
Paul Chastain - acoustic guitar
John Ginty - organ, piano, harpsichord
Brian Kehew - organ, piano, harpsichord
Pamelia Kurstin - theremin

References

1999 albums
Matthew Sweet albums
Volcano Entertainment albums
Albums produced by Matthew Sweet